Murree District (Urdu) is a district in the northernmost part of Punjab province of Pakistan, with it being headquartered in Murree city. It is a relatively new district established on 14 October 2022, and is a tourist district of Pakistan. It has two tehsils, Kotli Sattian and Murree. The district headquarters is Murree city.

Administrative division
Murree District is governed by the Murree District Council, while several regions sub-divided into one Municipal Corporation, two tehsils:

References

Districts of Punjab, Pakistan
 
Murree District